Francesco Tagliani (born January 29, 1914 in Lomazzo) was an Italian professional football player.

1914 births
Year of death missing
People from Lomazzo
Italian footballers
Serie A players
S.S.D. Varese Calcio players
Inter Milan players
Atalanta B.C. players
A.C. Legnano players
Association football midfielders
A.S.D. La Biellese players
Footballers from Lombardy
Sportspeople from the Province of Como